The Worker was a newspaper published in Brisbane, Queensland, Australia between 1890 and 1974. It was affiliated with the Australian Labor Party.

History
The newspaper was first published as Vol. 1, no. 1 on 1 March  1890 and the last issue was Vol. 85, no. 4119 on 19 August 1974. It was originally known as The Australian Workman, and later as The Brisbane Worker.
While the official title of the newspaper is The worker : monthly journal of the Associated Workers of Queensland, from 1896 the subtitle was changed to Official journal of the Federated Workers of Queensland. Between 1917 and 1918 the subtitle was Australia's pioneer co-operative labor journal.

Digitisation 
The paper has been digitised as part of the Australian Newspapers Digitisation Program of the National Library of Australia.

See also
 List of newspapers in Australia

References

External links
 

Newspapers published in Brisbane
Defunct newspapers published in Queensland
Australian labour movement
Newspapers established in 1890
Publications disestablished in 1975
Newspapers on Trove
1890 establishments in Australia
1975 disestablishments in Australia